Rija Randrianasolo (born 1973), known as Rijasolo, is a photojournalist based in Antananarivo, Madagascar. He won a World Press Photo Award for Africa 2022 in the long-term category, and Paritana Contemporary Art Award in 2019.

Life and work 
Randrianasolo was born in France and is currently based in Antananarivo, Madagascar. He was a reporter-photographer during the French presidential campaign in 2007 for Wostok Press agency. He was awarded a grant from the Pulitzer Center on Crisis Reporting.

Awards 

 Leica 35 mm Wide Angle contest, Leica Camera, 2010 
 Paritana Contemporary Art Award, 2019
 World Press Photo Award for Africa, Long-Term Category, 2022

Publications 

 Madagascar, nocturnes. No Comment, 2013. .

References

External links 

  
 
1973 births
Living people
Photojournalists
21st-century photographers